The 75 mm gun M1916 was a US Army field artillery piece used during and after World War I. It was used as an anti-aircraft gun as well as a field piece. It originated as the 3-inch gun M1913, which was soon modified to the 3-inch gun M1916, which was later altered to the subject weapon.

History

This weapon originated with the acquisition in 1912 of a 75 mm gun designed by Col. Deport of the French Army. The US Army wished to examine and adopt a split-trail carriage, which would allow a higher elevation for indirect fire and dropping shells into trenches. This carriage type was used on the prototype 3-inch model of 1913, which was later designated the 3-inch gun M1916 after a major carriage redesign, prompted by field trials of the M1913. By early 1917 only 34 weapons had been completed; one source traces this to the Ordnance Department developing the weapon without input from the Field Artillery, compounded by a complex top carriage intended to allow 45 degrees of traverse. Shortly after the American entry into World War I, the US Army decided to adopt French and British weapons, and modify their own weapons where possible to accept French or British ammunition. The M1916 was modified to a 75 mm bore, including alteration of existing weapons, permitting interchangeability of ammunition with French guns as the 75 mm gun M1916.

The gun's hydro-spring recoil system consisted of an oil cylinder on top of the barrel and two spring cylinders underneath. It did not work at high elevation angles, and by early 1918 production of the US version of the French Canon de 75 modèle 1897 was emphasized. By the end of 1918, shortly after the war ended, only 251 weapons had been completed; 34 had been shipped to France but did not see action. A combination of a limited pre-war munitions industry, the short (19-month) US participation in the war, technical problems with large-scale production, and the ready availability of munitions in France led to this.

In an attempt to resolve the recoil system problems, hydro-pneumatic recoil cylinders (using compressed air instead of springs) were designed by a French officer who had previously done this for Schneider-Creusot. In the US these were called the "St. Chamond" recuperator (touching off a flap in France over the US "stealing" military secrets), but only 60 of these were delivered by the end of 1919. Field trials in France showed that there was excessive play in the elevation and traverse mechanisms, making the gun very inaccurate, along with poor durability in cross-country movement. However, production continued postwar; eventually 810 barrels and 362 field carriages were delivered. The surplus of barrels led to the weapon's use for other purposes.

Carriage orders were 300 in 1916, 340 in May 1917, and 400 to New York Air Brake in June 1917, totaling 1,040, with only 362 completed.

Antiaircraft use
51 of these weapons were mounted on 2.5-ton White trucks for anti-aircraft (AA) use, designated the AA truck mount M1917. Some of these weapons reached France before the Armistice, the only US-made AA weapons to do so. These weapons saw some action prior to the war's end and shot down their first aircraft on May 18, 1918 when soldiers of the U.S. 2nd Anti-Aircraft battery downed a German observation plane over no-man's land. Prior to the commencement of this program, 50 AA truck mounts were shipped to France without guns as a stopgap, where French 75s were mounted on them. The low muzzle velocity and limited elevation and traverse of the AA mounting (31° to 82° elevation, 240° traverse) impaired the weapon's effectiveness. By 1940 the AA version of the weapon was no longer in active service, but a few were retained for training.

Between World Wars 
Although World War I had shown that light field guns like the M1916 lacked adequate firepower to destroy an entrenched enemy the majority of combatants had large numbers of them and had little impetus to replace them.  With a limited peacetime budget, the US Army like other armies opted to modernize its artillery by switching from horse traction to motor traction.

Beginning in 1938, funds were made available for the conversion of 180 of 320 M1916s to use motor traction and nearly all were eventually converted to the new M1916A1 or M1916MIA1 standard.  The kits included sprung axles, steel wheels, and pneumatic tires that allow them to be towed at higher speeds.

World War II

Australian service 
An unknown number of guns served with Australian troops who used them as anti-tank guns during the Malayan Campaign.

British service
Early in World War II Britain lost many of its field guns in France, and in 1941 150 M1916s were supplied to Britain where they were used for training and to equip Home Guard units.

Greek service
50 guns were supplied to Greece.

Haitian service 
6 M1916s that were supplied to Haiti were captured during Operation Uphold Democracy in 1994.

Philippine service 
14 guns were supplied to the Philippine Army and participated in the Philippines Campaign where all were lost.

US service
The Coast Artillery Corps deployed about 24 of these weapons on fixed pedestal mounts for land defense in the Panama Canal Zone in 1926, replacing the 4.7 inch howitzer M1913 in this role. An additional 100 barrels were acquired by the Coast Artillery for use in sub-caliber training alongside (or mounted on) large guns, such as the long-range barbette mounting of the 12-inch gun M1895.

Yugoslavian service 
An unknown number were supplied to Yugoslavia but the shipment was diverted while at sea to the Western Desert after the Invasion of Yugoslavia.

Variants
 M1916 mounted on M1916 carriage
 M1916MI mounted on M1916A1 carriage (rubber tire)
 M1916MII mounted on M1916A1 carriage
 M1916MII-1/2 mounted on M1916A1 carriage
 M1916MIII mounted on M1916A1 carriage
 M1916MIII-1/2 mounted on M1916A1 carriage
 M1916MIIIA1 mounted on M1916MI carriage
 M1916MIIIA1 mounted on M1916MIA1 carriage
 M1916MIII-1/2A1 mounted on M1916MIA1 carriage
 The antiaircraft model was mounted on a White Motor Company 2.5-ton truck as the AA truck mount M1917.
 An experimental tracked self-propelled mounting, known as the Mark VII Self-Propelled Caterpillar Mount, was tested in the 1920s.

Support vehicles
In World War I, a battery of 75-mm guns was accompanied by the following:
 75 mm limber M1918
 75 mm Caisson M1918
 Forge limber M1902M1
 Store limber M1902M1
 Battery and store wagon M1917
 Battery reel M1917
 Reel M1909M1
 Cart M1918

Gallery

Surviving examples
 American Legion post, Champaign, Illinois

See also
 List of U.S. Army weapons by supply catalog designation
 List of artillery by name
 75 mm gun M1917 (weapon of similar role and era)
 United States home front during World War I

References

 TM 9-2005, Ordnance Materiel - General, Vol. 3, Infantry- and Cavalry-accompanying weapons, Field Artillery, December 1942
  FM 6-60 Service of the Piece – 75-mm Gun, M1916 and M1916-A1, Horse-drawn and Truck-drawn
 
 Crowell at Google Books
 
 Ordnance Department, U.S. Army, Handbook of Ordnance Data, November 15, 1918, Washington: Government Printing Office, 1919
 Office of the Chief of Ordnance, Handbook of Artillery, May, 1920, Washington: Government Printing Office, 1920

External links

 Photos of a reproduction or restored M1918 limber for the 75 mm gun M1897 with all accoutrements

World War I artillery of the United States
Anti-aircraft guns of the United States
Field guns
75 mm artillery